The New Zealand under-19 secondary schools football team (also known as New Zealand U19 Schoolboys) represents New Zealand in association football at under-19 age-group level. It is controlled by the New Zealand Secondary Schools Football Association (NZSSFA) which is affiliated to New Zealand Football (NZF).

History

Overview 
The New Zealand U19 schoolboys national team "fills a vital role in the development of the international player pool in New Zealand in the gap between the under-17 and under-20 programs."

As all of New Zealand's top youth players attend secondary school full-time, the player pool for under-19 selections is the same as that of the under-17 program. The process begins with secondary schools nominating their best players to go forward for provincial trials. From this, 36 players are named to a national selection camp where a final 18-man squad is selected for international tournaments.

Competitions 
Historically, the team travels to the United Kingdom every two years and plays against the Centenary Shield U18 and U19 national teams of England, Scotland, Wales, the Republic of Ireland and Northern Ireland. They have also competed in friendlies and tournaments in Austria, Korea, Australia and the United States. In 2021, the team will resume their four nations contest in the UK.

Recent Success 

In 2013, the New Zealand under-19 schoolboys national team toured the United Kingdom under former Leeds United defender and now acclaimed NZ coach, Danny Hay, and they achieved the best set of results in history. The team drew 1–1 with both England and Scotland, beat Wales 2-1 and were victorious over prestigious five nations Centenary Shield champions, Northern Ireland, 2–0.

As a result of the team's impressive performances in 2013, numerous players including Judd Baker and Sam Brotherton were offered trials with professional clubs in the UK. Judd Baker was eventually signed by Premier League side Swansea City A.F.C. and is also a New Zealand under-20 international. Sam Brotherton, vice-captain of the 2013 squad, has since signed for Sunderland A.F.C. and represented New Zealand at U20, U23 and full international level. Arguably the most successful graduate since the program's inception in 2000 is goalkeeper, Stefan Marinovic, who as a result of his performances in Austria 2008, was offered trials with Everton FC, FC Zurich and FC Schalke 04. He is now the first-choice goalkeeper for the New Zealand senior national team and plays for the Vancouver Whitecaps in the MLS.

Rivalries 

The team's loose rivals are Trans-Tasman neighbors Australia, having first played each other at Arlington Park, NSW on 25 August 1938. New Zealand has lost to Australia 2-0 in both 2016 and 2019.

Coaching staff

Current squad 
The following players were named in the New Zealand U19 Schoolboys final 18-man squad on 10 December 2015 to tour Australia in July 2016.

Caps and goals correct at 10 December 2015

Results and fixtures

2013

2016

2019

External links

References 

Under-19